Stephen Salyer is the former president and chief executive officer of Salzburg Global Seminar, an independent, non-governmental organization based in Salzburg, Austria and Washington, D.C. He has been president and chief executive officer of Public Radio International and in 1981, he was made vice president and director of the educational division at WNET/Thirteen in New York City, the flagship producer for the PBS television network.

References

External links 
 Salzburg Global Seminar
 Schloss Leopoldskron
 Salzburg Academy on Media and Global Change

Davidson College alumni
Harvard Kennedy School alumni
New York University School of Law alumni
Living people
Year of birth missing (living people)